Stephen Mark Small (born 2 March 1955) is an Australian former cricketer. He played first-class cricket for New South Wales and Tasmania.

See also
 List of Tasmanian representative cricketers
 List of New South Wales representative cricketers

References

External links
 

1955 births
Living people
Australian cricketers
New South Wales cricketers
Tasmania cricketers
Cricketers from Sydney